WTAW-FM (103.5 FM, "Willy 103.5") is a radio station broadcasting a Country format.  Licensed to Buffalo, Texas, United States, it serves a section of the Interstate 45 corridor, between Houston and Dallas. It first began broadcasting in June 2015 under its current call sign. It is co-owned with 1620 WTAW, and WTAW's long-time 1150 home, the current KZNE.  The station is currently owned by Bryan Broadcasting Corporation;   studios are located in College Station and its transmitter is south of Buffalo.

History
Bryan Broadcasting Corporation received a construction permit to build a Class A radio station in Buffalo, Texas on June 21, 2012. The station received its license to cover on June 17, 2015, and signed on as Country music station Willy 103.5.

In addition to the regular country programming, "Willy 103.5" also features Boys and Girls Buffalo Bison Varsity sports programming, and live play by play of most games.

External links
Radio Aggieland Website

Radio stations established in 2015
2015 establishments in Texas
TAW-FM
Leon County, Texas